The Iron Library (German Eisenbibliothek) is a special, scientific and technical library in Schlatt, Thurgau in Switzerland. Its main focuses are manuscripts, books and journals on iron, metallurgy and plastics.

History 
The Iron Library Foundation was established on 31 December 1948, at the initiative of Ernst Müller (1885–1957). He had been director of Georg Fischer AG (GF). The Iron Library itself was opened in 1952 in the west wing of Klostergut Paradies in Schlatt, Thurgau. In this year the company Georg Fischer celebrated the 150th anniversary. Klostergut Paradies is the former Poor Clares monastery of Paradies, which had been purchased by Georg Fischer in 1918.

In 2014 the Iron Library became member of the Plastics Historical Society in London and the German Plastics Historical Society (Deutsche Gesellschaft für Kunststoffgeschichte) in Bayreuth.

Collection focuses 
Iron Library collects media from the following fields:
Iron and metallurgy
Plastics
History of technology and natural sciences
History of Georg Fischer AG

Manuscripts and rare books 
The Iron Library's collections contain valuable original holdings of scientific and cultural-historical relevance. The collections include:
 The "Aristoteles-Albertus-Magnus-manuscript" was written in the first half of 13th century. Its main parts are De mineralibus by Aristoteles and De natura loci by Albertus Magnus.
 Bartholomaeus Anglicus: De proprietatibus rerum. Printed by Pierre Hongre in Lyons, 1482. 
 Albertus Magnus: De natura locorum. Printed in Strasbourg, 1515.
 Wok Pniowsky von Eulenberg: Ayn liblichs piechel. Written in 1526.
 Georgius Agricola: De re metallica. Printed in Basel, 1556.
 Isaac Newton: Philosophiae Naturalis Principia Mathematica. Printed in London, 1687.
 Giuseppe Valadier: Disegni, e spiegazione della Fonderia principio, e termine della Campana di S. Pietro. Written in 1786.
 Christian von Mechel: Die eiserne Hand des tapferen deutschen Ritters Götz von Berlichingen. The book was printed in 1815 and is describing the iron hand of Götz von Berlichingen, which was created in 1530.
 Gustave Eiffel: La tour de trois cents mètres. (Eiffel Tower) Paris, 1900.

Georg Fischer Corporate Archives 
The Iron Library is connected with the older part of the corporate archives of Georg Fischer company.

Cultural property and heritage site of significance
The Iron Library is listed as Swiss cultural property of regional significance.

The archives of Georg Fischer and the former Poor Clares monastery of Paradies in Altparadies are listed as Swiss heritage sites of national significance. The entire Paradies monastery is included in the Inventory of Swiss Heritage Sites.

Literature
Annual Report 2019. Iron Library Foundation and Corporate Archives of Georg Fischer Ltd. Romanshorn 2020. ISSN 2297-8496.

References

External links

 Official Website of Iron Library (Eisenbibliothek)
 Journal Ferrum (Download)
 Iron Library at e-codices

Libraries in Switzerland
Cultural property of regional significance in Thurgau
Thurgau